Artur Marczewski (3 August 1896 – 1945) was a Polish footballer. He played in one match for the Poland national football team in 1921.

References

External links
 

1896 births
1945 deaths
Polish footballers
Poland international footballers
Place of birth missing
Association footballers not categorized by position